Halocypridae is a family of ostracods belonging to the order Halocyprida.  This family contains bioluminescent members such as Conchoecia pseudodiscophora, which are believed to use coelenterazine and a coelenterazine luciferase rather than vargulin.

Genera 
The following genera are recognised in the family Halocyprididae:
 
Alacia 
Archiconchoecemma 
Archiconchoecerra 
Archiconchoecetta 
Archiconchoecia 
Archiconchoecilla 
Archiconchoecinna 
Archiconchoecissa 
Austrinoecia 
Bathyconchoecetta 
Bathyconchoecia 
Boroecia 
Chavturia 
Clausoecia 
Conchoecetta 
Conchoecia 
Conchoecilla 
Conchoecissa 
Deeveyoecia 
Discoconchoecia 
Euconchoecia 
Fellia 
Gaussicia 
Halocypretta 
Halocypria 
Halocypris 
Hyalocoecia 
Juryoecia 
Kyrtoecia 
Lophuroecia 
Loricoecia 
Macrochoecilla 
Macroconchoecia 
Mamilloecia 
Metaconchoecia 
Mikroconchoecia 
Muelleroecia 
Mollicia 
Nasoecia 
Obtusoecia 
Orthoconchoecia 
Paraconchoecia 
Paramollicia 
Parthenoecia 
Parvidentoecia 
Platyconchoecia 
Porroecia 
Proceroecia 
Pseudoconchoecia 
Rotundoecia 
Schornikovoecia 
Scottoecia 
Septemoecia 
Vityazoecia

References

External links 
 

Ostracod families
Halocyprida